NewStore, Inc. provides Omnichannel-as-a-Service for enterprise retail brands worldwide. Its mobile-first, modular cloud platform includes point of sale (POS), order management (OMS), inventory, store fulfillment, clienteling, and native consumer app solutions.

The company was founded in 2015 by Stephan Schambach, who also founded Intershop Communications and Demandware, which was acquired by Salesforce in 2016 for US$2.8 billion. It is headquartered in Boston, USA with offices in Berlin, Germany and Utrecht, Netherlands. It received a Series A investment of US$38M in September 2015 and Series B investment of US$50M in July 2017. Additionally, the company raised US$45M in Series B-1 financing in July 2021, a strategic investment to accelerate company growth.

Funding

References 

2015 establishments in the United States
Retail point of sale systems
Providers of services to on-line companies
Online companies of the United States
Companies based in Boston